OCMS may refer to:
Oxford Centre for Mission Studies, a mission in Oxford, England
Old Crow Medicine Show, a folk/country musical group from Nashville, Tennessee
O.C.M.S., Old Crow Medicine Show's debut album